Alexander Arthur Fraser, 20th Lord Saltoun   (8 March 1886 – 31 August 1979), styled Master of Saltoun until 1933, was a Scottish peer who was one of the longest-serving representative peers, serving from 1935 to 1963.

He was the eldest son of Alexander Fraser, 19th Lord Saltoun and Mary Helena Grattan-Bellew, sister of Sir Henry Christopher Grattan-Bellew, 3rd Baronet.

He was educated at Eton College and New College, Oxford. He was a captain and Hon. Major in the Gordon Highlanders in WWI, when he was taken prisoner of war.

On 8 June 1920, he married Dorothy Geraldine Welby and they had two children:

Alexander Simon Fraser, Master of Saltoun (1921–1944), killed in action in the Second World War
Flora Marjory Fraser, 21st Lady Saltoun (b. 18 October 1930)

He died at Cross Deep, his home in Twickenham, aged 93.

References

1886 births
1979 deaths
Clan Fraser
Scottish representative peers
Recipients of the Military Cross
People educated at Eton College
Alumni of New College, Oxford
British Army personnel of World War I
British World War I prisoners of war
Lords Saltoun
Gordon Highlanders officers